Brant Lake South is a census-designated place (CDP) in Lake County, South Dakota, United States. The population was 140 at the 2020 census. It was established after the 2010 census.

Geography
Brant Lake South is in southeastern Lake County, on the south side of Brant Lake. It is bordered to the north by the town of Brant Lake and to the south by the unincorporated community of Chester.

Skunk Creek, the outlet of Brant Lake, passes through the southwest corner of the CDP and flows south to the Big Sioux River at Sioux Falls.

Demographics

References

Census-designated places in Lake County, South Dakota
Census-designated places in South Dakota